Bancroft Tower is a  natural stone and granite tower, which looks like a miniature feudal castle. It is located in Salisbury Park, in the city of Worcester, Massachusetts.  The folly was erected in 1900, in memory of Worcester native politician, historian, and statesman George Bancroft. The tower was designed by Worcester architects Earle and Fisher.  The cost of construction was roughly $15,000. Bancroft Tower is listed on the National Register of Historic Places.

Description 
Bancroft Tower is located northwest of downtown Worcester, in Salisbury Park, a public park located west of Park Avenue and south of Drury Lane.  It is a two-story stone structure, built out of boulders and cobbles, with a rock-faced granite exterior.  It is asymmetrical in plan, with crenellated square towers at the corners and a taller off-center circular tower in between. To the right of that tower is an arched gate.

History 
This tower was erected by Stephen Salisbury III in honor of George Bancroft, a prominent historian and statesman who had been a childhood friend of Salisbury's father.  It was one of three towers built on high points of the city, and is the only one to survive.  The park and tower remained in Salisbury's ownership until his death in 1907.  The tower was bequeathed to the Worcester Art Museum, which in turn donated it to the Worcester Parks Department in 1912. The Bancroft tower was listed on the National Register of Historic Places on March 5, 1980.

Plaque
A plaque set into the ground in front of it explains its purpose:

BANCROFT TOWER
THIS TOWER WAS BUILT IN 1900
TO HONOR THE MEMORY OF

GEORGE BANCROFT
1800–1891

BORN AT THE FOOT OF THIS HILL
HE ROSE TO THE POSTS OF
SECRETARY OF THE NAVY
FOUNDER OF THE U.S. NAVAL ACADEMY
ANNAPOLIS, MARYLAND
U.S. MINISTER TO GREAT BRITAIN
AND GERMANY

THIS MEMORIAL WAS BUILT BY HIS
FRIEND AND ADMIRER
STEPHEN SALISBURY III

Also notable about the small park in which the tower stands are the two half-compasses set into the ground in front of and behind the tower itself. They are marked as if they pointed to the other six of the Seven Hills of Worcester (Bancroft Hill itself being one of the seven), but it doesn't appear, from the top of the hill, that they really do.

Gallery

See also
National Register of Historic Places listings in northwestern Worcester, Massachusetts
National Register of Historic Places listings in Worcester County, Massachusetts
Folly

References

Monuments and memorials on the National Register of Historic Places in Massachusetts
Towers in Massachusetts
Castles in Massachusetts
Buildings and structures in Worcester, Massachusetts
Folly buildings on the National Register of Historic Places
Landmarks in Worcester, Massachusetts
National Register of Historic Places in Worcester, Massachusetts